The 1996–97 Saint Joseph's Hawks men's basketball team represented Saint Joseph's University as a member of the Atlantic-10 Conference during the 1996–97 NCAA Division I men's basketball season. Led by 2nd year head coach Phil Martelli, the Hawks finished with an overall record of 26–7 (13–3 in A-10 play). Saint Joseph's won both regular season and A-10 Tournament titles, and received an automatic bid to the NCAA tournament as No. 4 seed in the West Regional. The team defeated Pacific and Boston College to advance to the Sweet Sixteen before losing to No. 1 seed Kentucky in the regional semifinal.

Roster

Schedule and results

|-
!colspan=9 style=| Regular season

|-
!colspan=9 style=| A-10 Tournament

|-
!colspan=9 style=| NCAA Tournament

Rankings

References

Saint Joseph's
Saint Joseph's
Saint Joseph's Hawks men's basketball seasons